Karen Melnick is a mathematician and associate professor at University of Maryland, College Park. She specializes in differential geometry and was most recently awarded the 2020-2021 Joan and Joseph Birman Fellowship for Women Scholars by the American Mathematical Society.

Research
Melnick's primary research area is in differential-geometric aspects of rigidity, where she focuses on global and local results relating the automorphisms of a differential-geometric structure with the geometric and topological properties of the space. In addition, she is a leader in research in Lorentzian geometry and has done substantial work on the Lorentzian Lichnerowicz conjecture.

Melnick also has research interests in conformal pseudo-Riemannian structures, parabolic Cartan geometries in general, and smooth dynamics. Her research has earned her recognition as a strong collaborator on groundbreaking work with her fellow mathematicians.

Melnick has authored or co-authored fourteen academic papers in her field and has been cited by over sixty authors. She has also presented her work in a variety of seminars and colloquia internationally.

Education
Melnick received her Ph.D. in Mathematics from the University of Chicago in 2006, where she also earned her Master of Science in Mathematics in 2000, while working under the guidance of doctoral advisor Benson Farb. Her dissertation research focused on compact Lorentz manifolds with local symmetry. Prior to her graduate studies, Melnick received her Bachelor of Arts, also in Mathematics, from Reed College in 1999.

Career
Melnick currently works as an associate professor in the Department of Mathematics at University of Maryland, College Park, where she worked also worked as an assistant professor beginning in 2009 prior to her promotion. Before working at UMD, Melnick held the position of Gibbs Assistant Professor at Yale University while on an NSF Postdoctoral Research Fellowship.

In her career, Melnick has contributed significant service to the mathematics profession. In spring 2020, she taught a graduate topics course in exterior differential systems. In addition, she is and has been involved in organizing multiple workshops and seminars, including a two-week workshop on Cartan Connections, Geometry of Homogeneous Spaces, and Dynamics at the Erwin Schrödinger Institute in 2011, the weekly Geometry-Topology Seminar at University of Maryland, and an upcoming conference on geometric structures at Goethe University Frankfurt in 2021. She is also an advocate for women in her field, speaking at events such as the 2014 Nebraska Conference for Undergraduate Women in Mathematics.

Honors
Most recently, Melnick was awarded the 2020-2021 Joan and Joseph Birman Fellowship for Women Scholars by the American Mathematical Society for her research on differential-geometric aspects of rigidity. This prestigious fellowship, founded by mathematician Joan Birman and physicist Joseph L. Birman, is awarded to talented, mid-career women with a significant record of research in a core area of mathematics.

Melnick has previously been awarded an NSF CAREER Grant (2013), an AMS Centennial Fellowship (2012-2013), and a Junior Research Fellowship from the Erwin Schrödinger Institute (2009).

References

Year of birth missing (living people)
Living people
People from Marin County, California
Mathematicians from California
Reed College alumni
University of California, Berkeley alumni
University of Chicago alumni
University of California, Riverside faculty
University of Maryland, College Park faculty
Yale University faculty
Women mathematicians
20th-century American mathematicians
21st-century American mathematicians
Algebraic geometers